Joe Cook (born Joseph Lopez; March 29, 1890 – May 15, 1959) was an American vaudeville performer.  A household name in the 1920s and 1930s, Cook was one of America's most popular entertainers, and he headlined at New York's famed Palace Theatre. After appearing on Broadway he broke into radio.

Early life
Born Joseph Lopez in Evansville, Indiana, in 1890, he and his elder brother Leo were orphaned and adopted by a distant relative, Mrs. Anna Cook, at the age of three and six, respectively. He lived in the back of the grocery store of his adoptive parents at the corner of Fourth and Oak in Evansville.

Career
Cook joined a circus in 1906, which propelled him to vaudeville, Broadway, and Hollywood. His brother Leo and he were billed as "Joe Cook and Brother" were they were in vaudeville together, from about 1909 to 1916.

Joe Cook's physical talents were remarkable. He was an incredible juggler, could walk a tightrope, ride a unicycle, mime, and perform many other circus skills with ease.  With this, he combined an uncanny ability to tell nonsensical stories that made audiences roar with laughter.  Added to this was his penchant for creating ridiculously complex inventions to perform absurdly simple or totally useless tasks.  Mix in a little piano, violin, and ukulele playing and you had quite a show.  The broad variety of Cook's act led to his nickname – "One Man Vaudeville". New York Times critic Brooks Atkinson once wrote, "Next to Leonardo da Vinci, Joe Cook is the most versatile man known to recorded times." In 1930, noted columnist Walter Winchell wrote that "Joe Cook is certainly one of the musical theatre's three geniuses.  I can't at the moment think of the other two."

Following a very successful fifteen years in vaudeville - three of them in blackface, Cook - most often teamed with stooge/future restaurateur Dave Chasen - became a late 1920s/early 1930s Broadway musical comedy star. He appeared, most memorably, in such shows as Rain or Shine, Fine and Dandy - the first hit completely scored by a woman (Kay Swift), and Hold Your Horses. Corey Ford, the co-author of the last-named musical, wrote of Cook's Broadway debut: "When I first saw Joe Cook in 1923, he was co-starring in Earl Carroll's Vanities with Peggy Hopkins Joyce, whom he used to refer to as 'that somewhat different virgin'. I sat on the balcony and marveled at the bland deadpan expression, the slightly curved mouth, the easy flow of nonsense patter as he walked a tightrope or juggled Indian clubs while explaining to the audience why he would not imitate four Hawaiians." Cook's "Four Hawaiians" routine was his most famous; Joe would explain that he was actually imitating only two Hawaiians.  He "could imitate four Hawaiians but did not wish to do so because that would put all the performers who could only imitate two Hawaiians out of work".  Cook would appear on stage with a ukulele in hand and begin:

"I will give an imitation of four Hawaiians.  This is one [whistles]; this is another [plays ukulele], and this is the third [marks time with his foot].  I could imitate four Hawaiians just as easily, but I will tell you the reason why I don't do it.  You see, I bought a horse for $50 and it turned out to be a running horse.  I was offered $15,000 for him, and I took it.  I built a house for the $15,000, and when it was finished, a neighbor offered me $100,000 for it.  He said my house stood right where he wanted to dig a well.  So I took the $100,000 to accommodate him.  I invested $100,000 on peanuts, and that year, there was a peanut famine, so I sold the peanuts for $350,000.  Now, why should a man with $350,000 bother to imitate four Hawaiians?"
 
Never a fan of Hollywood, Cook made only two full-length movies and a handful of short subjects, which is a major reason he is not widely remembered today. In 1930, he starred in the film version of Rain or Shine, which was directed by a young Frank Capra, and is still shown occasionally on television. It has recently been completely restored and will be permanently preserved by Sony Pictures, the successor of Columbia Pictures. In 1935 Earle W. Hammons of Educational Pictures, needing a "name" comedian for that season's short-subject program, signed Joe Cook. Cook starred in five two-reel comedies (and wrote the scripts for three) at Educational's New York studio. Cook's only other feature film, Arizona Mahoney, was filmed in 1936 and included a young Larry "Buster" Crabbe.  

The 1930s also saw Cook's successful transition into the new medium of radio, as the host of two variety series and a frequent guest on many others.
 
Cook, from 1924 to 1941, made his residence at Lake Hopatcong, in Hopatcong, New Jersey, which was then a popular resort.  His house was appropriately named "Sleepless Hollow" for the many parties he gave and celebrities he entertained. One visitor, his librettist Donald Ogden Stewart, later recalled that "Joe lived on a mad gag-infested estate in New Jersey which bewilderingly expressed his genius. On his three-hole golf course one drove off confidently into what looked like a fairway only to have one's ball rebound sharply over one's head from a huge rock that had been cunningly camouflaged. The last green was a golfer's paradise in that no matter where the ball landed it rolled obediently into the hole. Conditions inside the house were similarly deranged. The "butler" was one of the contortionists, acrobats, midgets, or other show-business people whom Joe had picked up his years in Vaudeville. Poor Mrs. Cook lived bravely in this cuckooland and struggled apologetically to bring some degree of common sense into the madhouse."   The Cookhouse still survives at Lake Hopatcong but is not open to the public.

Later life and death
Cook was diagnosed with Parkinson's disease in 1941.  This forced his retirement from show business.  He sold the lake house the same year and moved to a more modest residence in New York State, where he resided until his death in 1959.  Had Cook stayed healthy until the advent of television, his playful and physical style of comedy might well have made him one of the new medium's biggest stars, as was the case with his contemporary, Milton Berle.

References

Sources 

 
 
 
 Lake Hopatcong News

External links

 
 
 Lake Hopatcong Historical Museum

1890 births
1959 deaths
Deaths from Parkinson's disease
Neurological disease deaths in New York (state)
Actors from Evansville, Indiana
People from Hopatcong, New Jersey
Vaudeville performers
Male actors from Indiana